Ahmed Hassan Awke (1943 16 November 2015) was a veteran Somali journalist, who spent most of his life in the media industry. Awke who is often considered to be one of the best Somali journalists because of his very fluent Somali, and was often used as a favorite commentator  He served as a special reporter for Somalia's late president Siad Barre until it collapsed in 1991. He hailed from the Jibril Abokor, a Sa'ad Musa sub-division of the Habr Awal Isaaq clan that predominately inhabits the Gabiley region.

Early life 
Ahmed Hassan Awke was born in the border town of Tog-Wajale in 1943. His father Hassan Awke was a well-known businessman in Somaliland. 

As a child, he grew up in Tog-Wajale, but after completing Qur'anic education at a madrasa he moved to the town of Adadley, where he completed his primary and secondary school education. He graduated from higher education in Berbera in 1971, where he taught for a year as a teacher.

Career
Awke began his career at Radio Mogadishu in 1972, and then become a reporter at Somali National Television in 1983. In 1996, he joined the BBC Somali and then moved to VOA Somali in 2007. He also worked with Horn Cable TV, Universal TV and Somaliland National TV, Somaliland's state-run television channel.The former president of Somalia Hassan Sheikh Mohamud said that Awke has made a significant contribution to the history of Somalia.

Death 
He died on 17 November 2015 in Jijiga, Ethiopia. He was buried the next day in Tog-Wajale, his home town.

See also

 Radio Mogadishu
 Somali National Television
 Somaliland National TV
 BBC
 VOA
 Universal TV
 Horn Cable Television

Literature

References

BBC people
1943 births
2015 deaths
Somaliland people